Quick Response Code Indonesia Standard (abbreviated as QRIS, the abbreviation being a play on keris, a traditional sword) is a QR code standard developed by Bank Indonesia (BI) and Indonesian Payment System Association for cashless payments in Indonesia.

History 
Before Bank Indonesia (BI) applied the standard, QR codes used by mobile payment services were exclusive to themselves; a QR code issued by one service cannot be used by another. On 16 August 2019, by the ratification of Board of Governor Decree No. 21/18/PADG/2019 on the Implementation of Quick Response Code National Standard for Payment Purpose, BI announced integration of cashless payment methods and services. This standard, named Quick Response Code Indonesia Standard (QRIS), was launched on the 74th anniversary of Indonesia's Independence Day. Payment services were required to implement QRIS by 1 January 2020.

During the start of COVID-19 pandemic in Indonesia, many small and large businesses in Indonesia registered their stores to obtain a QRIS-compliant QR codes to accommodate increasing demand of online transactions and reduce the spread of COVID-19 from banknotes and coins. Secretary of Ministry of Cooperatives and SMEs of The Republic of Indonesia, Rully Indrawan, stated that by using QRIS, merchants "...could develop their credit profile which in turn increasing their chance to get funding loans. [...] Each transaction can also be documented and directly transferred to merchant's bank account, as well as helps prevent robbery and distribution of fake money."

According to BI, by October 2020, QRIS has already implemented by 3.6 million small and micro businesses in Indonesia. QRIS has also been implemented in several tourist attractions and public transport ticketing apps.

References

External links 

 
 

Digital currencies
Indonesian brands
Online payments
2019 establishments in Indonesia
Barcodes